Dix Terne was a West German bobsledder who competed in the early 1950s. He won two medals in the four-man event at the FIBT World Championships with one silver in 1954 and one bronze in 1953 (tied with Sweden).

References
Bobsleigh four-man world championship medalists since 1930

German male bobsledders
Possibly living people
Year of birth missing